Suzi ... and Other Four Letter Words, released in 1979, is the sixth studio album by American singer-songwriter, bass guitar player, and actress Suzi Quatro.  this was still Quatro's highest-charting album in Norway (at number 4) and her second-highest-charting album in the United States (at number 117).
 

The album contains three singles, all of which charted. "She's in Love with You", a number 1 hit in South Africa (where it topped the chart for 7 weeks), a top 20 hit in the United Kingdom, Austria, the Netherlands, Norway, and Switzerland, a top 40 hit in Australia and also a minor chart hit in New Zealand and the United States. "Mama's Boy" made chart appearances in both the United Kingdom and in the Netherlands and "I've Never Been in Love" charted in the United States as well as the United Kingdom.

Background
This, Quatro's sixth studio LP, was released after she moved from the United States to Britain. It is her last studio album before she decided not to renew her contract with record producer Mickie Most's RAK Records label. (Instead she signed a contract with Dreamland Records, which had been set up by songwriters/producers Mike Chapman and Nicky Chinn).

Critical reception

Writing for Smash Hits in 1979, Red Starr described the album as "ten immediately accessible chunks of bouncy, straightforward pop-rock". In his retrospective review for AllMusic, Donald A. Guarisco awards this album . He sees Quatro as making "a strong return to her hard-rocking roots" with the album. Example "bracing rocker" tracks are "I've Never Been in Love" and "She's in Love with You". These are "judiciously balanced with a string of tuneful, keyboard-based mid-tempo tunes" such as "Hollywood" and the "pop-inflected reggae groove" of "Four Letter Words". Guarisco feels that the downside of the album is that "many of the songs recycle the same double-time backbeat" and singles out "You Are My Lover" whose melody "is minimalist to the point of being repetitive". He concludes that:
"Despite these minor problems, Suzi...and Other Four Letter Words remains a solid slab of rock that is guaranteed to please the Suzi Quatro fanbase."

Track listing
 "I've Never Been in Love" (Melissa A. Connell) – 3:02
 "Mind Demons" (Suzi Quatro, Len Tuckey) – 2:25
 "She's in Love with You" (Mike Chapman, Nicky Chinn) – 3:32
 "Hollywood" (Quatro, Tuckey) – 2:57
 "Four Letter Words" (Chapman, Chinn) – 3:27
 "Mama's Boy" (Quatro, Tuckey) – 3:35
 "Starlight Lady" (Quatro, Tuckey) – 3:36
 "You Are My Lover" (Jack Lee) – 3:12
 "Space Cadets" (Quatro, Tuckey) – 4:18
 "Love Hurts" (Quatro, Tuckey) – 2:45

Personnel
 Suzi Quatro – lead vocals, bass guitar, writer
 Len Tuckey – lead guitar, rhythm guitar, acoustic guitar, backing vocals, writer
 Jamie Crompton – guitar, backing vocals
 Bill Hurd – keyboard, backing vocals
 Dave Neal – drums
Technical
 Dave Tickle – engineer
 Peter Coleman – engineer
 Glenn Ross – art direction
 Norman Seeff – photography
 Steve Hall – mastering
 Nicky Chinn – writer
 Mike Chapman – producer, writer

Charts
Suzi ... and Other Four Letter Words (1979 album)

 Suzi...and Other Four Letter Words (1979) was still Quatro's highest-charting album in Norway, beating both Quatro (1974), which reached number 5, and Suzi Quatro (1973), which reached number 6. It was also her second-highest-charting album in the United States, behind If You Knew Suzi... (1978), which reached number 37 in The Billboard 200.

"She's in Love with You" / "Space Cadets" (or "Starlight Lady" in the US) (1979 single)

"Mama's Boy" / "Mind Demons" (1980 single)

"I've Never Been in Love" / "Starlight Lady" (or "Space Cadets" in the US) (1980 single)

References

External links

Suzi Quatro albums
Albums produced by Mike Chapman
Rak Records albums
1979 albums